Jervvasstind (also known as: Gjertvasstind and Østre Styggedalstind) is Norway's ninth-highest mountain. The  mountain lies in the Hurrungane mountains in the eastern part of the municipality of Luster in Vestland county, Norway. It lies on the eastern end of a mountain ridge including the mountains (west to east) Store Skagastølstind-Vetle Skagastølstind-Sentraltind-Store Styggedalstind-Jervvasstind.

Name
The first element is the genitive of the name of the lake Jervvatnet and the last element is tind which means "mountain peak". The first element in the lake name is jerv which means "wolverine" and the last element is the finite form of vatn which means "water" or "lake". The name Gjertvasstind is preferred since 2005.

First ascents 
The first recorded ascent was by William Cecil Slingsby and Emanuel Mohn in 1876. The first winter ascent was by Arne Randers Heen and Ernst Bakke in 1953.

See also
List of mountains of Norway

References

Mountains of Vestland
Jotunheimen
Luster, Norway